Ringgi is one of the unique traditional food in Perlis. It suitable to eat with sugar and grated coconut. Sometimes, people eat it with buffalo milk as 
breakfast cereal.

See also

 Cuisine of Malaysia

References

External links
 Ringgi Pulau Timbul

Malay cuisine
Snack foods